One human poll made up the 1999 National Association of Intercollegiate Athletics (NAIA) football rankings, sometimes called the NAIA Coaches' Poll or the football ratings. Once the regular season was complete, the NAIA sponsored a playoff to determine the year's national champion. It is not known whether a final poll was taken after completion of the 1999 NAIA Football National Championship, won by Northwestern Oklahoma State.

Poll release dates 
The poll release dates were:
 August 24, 1999 (Preseason)
 September 7, 1999 (Week 1)
 September 14, 1999 (Week 2)
 September 21, 1999 (Week 3)
 September 28, 1999 (Week 4)
 October 5, 1999 (Week 5)
 October 12, 1999 (Week 6)
 October 19, 1999 (Week 7)
 October 26, 1999 (Week 8)
 November 2, 1999 (Week 9)
 November 9, 1999 (Week 10)
 November 14, 1999 (Final Regular-Season)

Week by week poll

Leading vote-getters 
Since the inception of the Coaches' Poll in 1999, the #1 ranking in the various weekly polls has been held by only a select group of teams.  Through the postseason poll of the 1999 season, the teams and the number of times they have held the #1 weekly ranking are shown below.  The number of times a team has been ranked #1 in the postseason poll (the national champion) is shown in parentheses.

There has been only one tie for the leading vote-getter in a weekly poll.  In 2015, Southern Oregon was tied with Marian (IN) in the preseason poll.

In 1999, the results of a postseason poll, if one was conducted, are not known.  Therefore, an additional poll has been presumed, and the #1 postseason ranking has been credited to the postseason tournament champion, the Northwestern Oklahoma State Rangers.

References 

Rankings
NAIA football rankings